"Push" is a song by Canadian alternative rock band Moist. It was released in 1994 as the lead single from the band's debut studio album, Silver. The song peaked at number 32 on Canada's Singles Chart. The song was also nominated for "Single of the Year" at the 1995 Juno Awards. It is considered to be one of the band's signature songs.

Music video
The music video for "Push" was shot on January 20, 1994 and cost $3000 Canadian dollars. The video was directed by Brenton Spencer and filmed in Black and white. The video reached #1 on the MuchMusic Countdown for the week of June 10, 1994. The video won the "Best Video" award at the 1995 Juno Awards. The video was critiqued on the 1995 Beavis and Butt-Head episode "Bad Dog" and was included on the Beavis and Butthead Mike Judge Collection DVD along with 10 other music videos.

Charts

References

External links

1994 singles
Moist (Canadian band) songs
1994 songs
Capitol Records singles
Songs written by David Usher